A parol is a Christmas lantern from the Philippines.

Parol may also refer to:

 The Sulu Archipelago in the Philippines
 The parol evidence rule in contract law
 Tina Parol, American singer-songwriter